The 2nd semi-final of the ICC Cricket World Cup 2011 was played between the Indian cricket team and the Pakistani cricket team at the Punjab Cricket Association Stadium, Mohali on 30March 2011. India won the toss and elected to bat, making 260 runs in their 50 overs while losing 9 wickets. Pakistan, after starting well, fell short; they were all out for 231 runs in 49.5 overs. Thus, India won the match by 29 runs and qualified for the 2011 Cricket World Cup Final, while eliminating Pakistan from the tournament. India subsequently beat Sri Lanka in the final, winning the 2011 Cricket World Cup.

Rivalry background

India and Pakistan have been rivals in various fields since the Partition of India in 1947. Since then the countries have fought three wars against each other. Since the first international cricket match between the two countries in 1952, political or diplomatic tensions frequently influenced their cricket relations, including the suspension of cricket tours. Once it became clear that the two teams would play each other in the 2nd semi-final of the ICC Cricket World Cup in 2011 a great deal of hype was generated; the match was even equated to war.

Match
The match was played on 30March 2011 at the Punjab Cricket Association Stadium, Mohali in India. There were fears that rain would curtail or postpone the match until the Meteorological Department issued assurances that the period of the match would be rain-free. The Indian captain won the toss and elected to bat first. India made 260 runs in their 50 overs, losing 9 wickets. Sachin Tendulkar top scored with 85 runs and was declared the man of the match. Pakistan on the other hand, though getting off to a good start failed to maintain consistency and were restricted to just 231 runs while being bowled out in 49.5 overs. India won the match and confirmed their place in the 2011 Cricket World Cup Final.

1st innings

Fall of wickets: 1-48 (Virender Sehwag, 5.5 ov), 2-116 (Gautam Gambhir, 18.5 ov), 3-141 (Virat Kohli, 25.2 ov), 4-141 (Yuvraj Singh, 25.3 ov), 5-187 (Sachin Tendulkar, 36.6 ov), 6-205 (MS Dhoni, 41.4 ov), 7-236 (Harbhajan Singh, 46.4 ov), 8-256 (Zaheer Khan, 49.2 ov), 9-258 (Ashish Nehra, 49.5 ov)

2nd innings

Fall of wickets: 1-44 (Kamran Akmal, 8.6 ov), 2-70 (Mohammad Hafeez, 15.3 ov), 3-103 (Asad Shafiq, 23.5 ov), 4-106 (Younis Khan, 25.4 ov), 5-142 (Umar Akmal, 33.1 ov), 6-150 (Abdul Razzaq, 36.2 ov), 7-184 (Shahid Afridi, 41.5 ov), 8-199 (Wahab Riaz, 44.5 ov), 9-208 (Umar Gul, 46.1 ov), 10-231 (Misbah-ul-Haq, 49.5 ov)

Buildup and aftermath
Governments in almost all the states and provinces of both nations declared official holidays on 30March in view of this match. Thousands of television screens were installed in public places across both nations, and television stores experienced increased sales of sets in order to watch this and other games at the 2011 World Cup.
The match was played in front of a huge crowd. This included Victory Venkatesh, Aamir Khan, Priety Zinta, Vivek Oberoi and many other celebrities and diplomats from both nations. Cricket diplomacy was used to strengthen the relationships between the two nations after the deterioration caused by the 2008 Mumbai attacks: Prime Minister of India Manmohan Singh invited his Pakistani counterpart, Yousuf Raza Gilani, to watch the match with him at Mohali; Gilani accepted.

After the victory, revelry erupted throughout India and fans across the country celebrated through the night. In Pakistan, the loss was met with violence and agitation by several fans. In Pakistan it was reported that three people, including a Pakistani actor, died of shock after Pakistan lost the match. Pakistani former cricketers and fans criticised the Pakistani team for their weak fielding and batting after a good showing earlier in the competition. The match drew high television ratings – in India it had an estimated 11.74% TV rating for the whole match, although its audience was beaten by the India v Sri Lanka final with 135 million viewers.

References

Limited overs cricket matches
Final
India–Pakistan cricket rivalry at Finals
Cricket World Cup matches